Bishop's Clyst was an ancient manor in Devonshire and is also the modern name adopted by the council representing two civil parishes that form part of the East Devon district in the English county of Devon.

Bishop's Clyst was formed in 1976 by the merger of the parish councils of Clyst St Mary and Sowton. These are two separate settlements Sowton being a mile or so north of Clyst St Mary.

Anciently Bishop's Clist or Clists-Bishops was a manor in the parish of Faringdon held by the de Sachville family and later mortgaged by them to Walter Branscombe (d.1280), Bishop of Exeter. It was later granted by Bishop John Vesey (d.1554) to John Russell, 1st Earl of Bedford.

References 

Local government in Devon
East Devon District